Patrick Segeja Chokala (3 March 1948 – 6 November 2020) was an ambassador of the United Republic of Tanzania to the Russian Federation.

References 

1948 births
2020 deaths
Ambassadors of Tanzania to Russia
Ambassadors of Tanzania to Ukraine